The Irish Water Spaniel (Irish: An Spáinnéar Uisce) is a breed of dog that is the tallest of the spaniels.

Description

Appearance
The Irish Water Spaniel is a sturdy, cobby dog native to Ireland. The coat, consisting of dense curls, sheds very little. (see Moult) The colour is liver/puce and has a very definite purple hue unlike the colour of any other known breed. The non-shedding characteristic of the coat means that people usually allergic to dogs might have less of an allergic reaction to Irish Water Spaniels (see hypoallergenic).

IWS have several distinguishing characteristics which place them among the more recognizable of all breeds:  The topknot of long, loose curls growing down from the head which often covers the eyes; a "beard" growing at the back of the throat often accompanied by "sideburns"; and a curled, liver ("puce")-coloured coat. The most distinguishing characteristic of these dogs is the smooth "rat tail", completely free of long coat except at the base where it is covered for 2–3 inches with curls. The face is entirely smooth-coated and, unlike the poodle, should require little or no trimming to stay that way. An IWS is ruggedly built with webbed feet to aid in its powerful swimming. Altogether, the IWS presents a picture of a smart, upstanding, strongly built but not leggy dog, combining great intelligence and rugged endurance with a bold, dashing eagerness of temperament.

They are the largest of the Spaniel group.  Dogs range in height from 22 to 24 inches (56–61 cm), and weigh 55 to 65 pounds (25–30 kg). As their name would imply these dogs love water.

Temperament
Like most dogs of the American Kennel Club Sporting group, the Irish Water Spaniel is essentially an active, willing and energetic companion.  Because it has been bred from stock used to fetch game and return it to hand without a fuss, it has the natural instinct of wanting to please.  Its keen sense of working as a team makes it a relatively easy dog to train and discipline.  Because of its great intelligence and quizzical nature, it has the reputation of being the clown of the spaniel family and will do ordinary things in extraordinary ways to achieve that which is asked of it.  Some individual dogs can be very wary of strangers and not every IWS can be trusted to get along with other pets. Early socialisation and training is a must.

History

The modern breed as we know it was developed in Ireland in the 1830s. It is not known from which other breeds Irish Water Spaniels were developed. The acknowledged father of the breed, Justin McCarthy from Dublin, left no breeding records. All manner of dogs have been suggested including: the Poodle, Portuguese Water Dog, Barbet, generic old water dog, the now-extinct English Water Spaniel as well as the Northern and Southern Water Spaniels, but whether Irish Water Spaniels are antecedents, descendants, or mixtures of these other breeds is a matter of some speculation. It is believed in Irish folklore to be the descendant of the Dobhar-chú.

Suitability as a pet
Irish Water Spaniels may make good family dogs, as they are usually excellent with respectful children and with other pets. They can make good guard dogs if they have been trained to do so, and will protect their human families. Not usually an aggressive dog, yet the IWS may have a deep, fierce-sounding bark.

All Irish Water Spaniels require a grooming regimen that includes maintaining healthy ears, teeth and nails. The tight double coat of the IWS sheds slightly, however many allergy sufferers have found them to be a comfortable pet with which to live.  The texture of the hair prevents the coat from becoming tightly woven into fabric and upholstery and any stray hairs are easily removed as they will gather together to form "dust bunnies".  The coat can be maintained by even the novice owner if a regular effort is maintained to keep it clean and free of mats.  A thorough combing to the skin should take place every 1–2 weeks to promote healthy skin and to remove any objects from the coat. Scissoring will be required every 6–8 weeks to neaten and shape the coat while regular exposure to water will promote the correct "ringlets" over the body coat.

Although happy to curl up and sleep at home, regular walks and exercise are essential for a healthy, contented water spaniel. An unexercised IWS may mean a naughty, mischievous IWS.  An ideal home though would be a working environment, where the dogs' minds as well as bodies are exercised.  Many IWS owners work their dogs in the shooting field, in obedience tests, in agility competitions, or in the conformation show ring.

Activities 
The IWS is a versatile breed and is found in all types of canine events including:
 Championship
 Junior Showmanship
 Companion events
 Obedience trial
 Rally obedience
 Dog agility
 Tracking trial
 Fly ball
 Performance and other dog sports
 Hunt tests
 Field trial
 Upland hunting
 Dock jumping
 Scent work / nose work

Irish Water Spaniel Club of Ireland
The Irish Water Spaniel Club of Ireland  is one of the oldest dog clubs in the world, supporting and promoting one of the most distinguished and oldest breed of dog in the world. The club is registered with the Irish Kennel Club.

Irish Water Spaniel Club of America
The IWSCA is the AKC parent club for the IWS. The club exists to preserve and protect this rare breed.  The Club helps educate owners and breeders and welcomes all members who share our love of this extraordinary, versatile dog.  The IWSCA's commitment to the health of the Irish Water Spaniel is reflected in its endorsement of transparency in health findings in accordance with organisations such as Orthopedic Foundation of America (OFA), Canine Health Information Center (CHIC), Canine Eye Registration Foundation (CERF) and Canine Health Foundation.

IWSCA breeders
Most of the breeders in the IWSCA belong to the Breeders Education Committee (BEC) The BEC exists to inform and educate IWSCA breeders on issues of health, genetics and breeding practices designed to promote the ongoing health and welfare of the Irish Water Spaniel. To this end the BEC breeders have agreed to a rigorous set of recommended breeding practices such as: open information exchange, health testing in accordance with the Irish Water Spaniel CHIC protocol, collaboration with the IWSCA Health and Genetics Committee, participation in breed-specific health studies, promotion of responsible pet ownership, and responsibility for any puppy they have bred – for the life of that dog. Individual B.E.C. breeders can be found on the IWSCA website.

IWS Health Foundation
The IWS Health Foundation's aim is to serve the worldwide Irish Water Spaniel community by providing a forum for internet-based collection and circulation of information, research and educational materials relating to the health and life expectancy of the breed, and for anyone with an interest to promote research for the long-term benefit of the breed.

See also
 Dogs portal
 List of dog breeds

References

External links

 

FCI breeds
Water dogs
Gundogs
Dog breeds originating in Ireland
Rare dog breeds
Vulnerable Native Breeds